SMJK Tsung Wah is a public funded secondary school located in Kuala Kangsar, Perak, Malaysia. Establishment of this secondary school started from the primary school SRJK Tsung Wah. In 1958, the Department of State Education approved the secondary level of education and further established SMJK Tsung Wah with 22 classes.

Headmasters
Chen Chi Chow, 1 January 1952 – 31 December 1969
Yong Ain Tai, 1 January 1970 – 31 December 1972
Yu Cheng Sun 1 January 1973 – 31 August 1992
Leong Chee Seng 16 October 1992 – 1 December 1996
Lily Chin, 1 December 1996 – 1 June 1998
Chew Boon Tai AMP 16 December 1998 – 3 July 2004
Yeoh Chow Khoon 16 July 2004 – 15 October 2006
Tung Chon Huat AMP 16 October 2006 – 30 March 2013
Ong Moy Chun 31 March 2013 – present

References

Secondary schools in Malaysia
Chinese-language schools in Malaysia
Kuala Kangsar District